Qottab ( qottâb) is an almond-filled deep-fried Iranian cuisine pastry or cake, prepared with flour, almonds, powdered sugar, vegetable oil, and cardamom. The city of Yazd is well known for its qottab.   

Qottab developed from an earlier savoury pastry known as sanbosag, the ancestor of the Ethiopian sambusa and the South Asian samosa. Since the 16th century, the original savoury form of sanbosag has become rare outside of the region of Laristan and the Persian Gulf Coast.

See also
 Gosh-e Fil
 Qutab

References

Iranian pastries
Iranian desserts
Kerman
Almond desserts
Deep fried foods